Juli Weiner is an American writer known for her work on the HBO show Last Week Tonight with John Oliver.

Biography 
Weiner is a native of Maple Glen, Pennsylvania. Her father is a heart surgeon. She graduated from Upper Dublin High School and from Barnard College in 2010. In college, she interned for Teen Vogue and blogged for Wonkette. She also wrote for The Huffington Post and The New Yorker. She was also the editor of Bwog and The Blue and White, both student-run publications at Columbia. She joined Vanity Fair in February 2010 while an undergraduate at Barnard. Donald Trump called her a "bad writer" after she wrote an online piece critical of him in 2011.

Weiner joined the staff of Last Week Tonight with John Oliver as one of only two women in the writing staff. She won five Primetime Emmy Award for Outstanding Writing for a Variety Series as a member of the writing staff from 2016 to 2020 and was nominated for another Emmy Award in 2015. She is a four-time winner of the Writers Guild of America Award for Television: Comedy-Variety Talk Series. In 2015, she was named one of the Forbes 30 Under 30.

In 2022, she was tapped as one of the writers for the new HBO series The Palace.

Personal life 
Weiner married The New York Times reporter Michael Grynbaum in 2019 at the National Arts Club, and has contributed pieces to The New York Times.

See also 
 New Yorkers in journalism

References

External links 

 

Living people
Barnard College alumni
Vanity Fair (magazine) people
Emmy Award winners
Writers Guild of America Award winners
Writers from Pennsylvania
American bloggers
Year of birth missing (living people)